MKS Instruments, Inc. is an American process control instrumentation company. It is headquartered in Andover, Massachusetts.

History 
MKS Instruments was founded in 1961 as a provider of products and technologies used to measure, control, power, and monitor critical process parameters of advanced manufacturing processes.

In 2001, the company acquired Emerson Electric's ENI Division which makes solid-state RF and DC plasma power supplies, networks and instruments.

In April 2014, Brooks Automation entered into an agreement to sell its Granville-Phillips division to MKS Instruments. MKS Instruments more than doubled their addressable market by acquiring the Newport Corporation and its subsidiaries, including Ophir Optronics, for $980 million ($1.2 billion inflation-adjusted) in a 2016 leveraged buyout. It acquired Electro Scientific Industries in 2019, and Atotech in 2021.

In 2021, MKS Instruments had about 5,400 employees and a market capitalization of about $11 billion.  As of 2021, sixty percent of the company's sales are from semiconductor products. On February 3, 2023, MKS Instruments fell victim to a ransomware attack that among others shut down their websites for more than ten days, forcing employees to use PTO during this time to get paid and return to work six weeks later with nothing being recovered.

Indexed with 

 PHLX Semiconductor Sector
 S&P 400 
 Russell 1000 Index

References

External links

American companies established in 1961
Companies based in Massachusetts
Companies listed on the Nasdaq